Deep Run may refer to the following places in the United States:

Alabama
 Deep Run (Godbolt Creek), a tributary of the Godbolt Creek in Baldwin County

Illinois
 Deep Run (Ellison Creek), a tributary of the Ellison Creek in Henderson County

Maryland
 Deep Run, Maryland, an unincorporated community in Carroll County
 Deep Run (Big Pipe Creek), a tributary of Big Pipe Creek in Carroll County
 Deep Run (Fifteenmile Creek), a tributary of Fifteenmile Creek in Allegany County
 Deep Run (Jones Falls), a tributary of Jones Falls in Baltimore County
 Deep Run (North Branch Patapsco River), at tributary of the North Branch Patapsco River in Carroll County
 Deep Run (Patapsco River), a tributary of the Patapsco River

New Jersey
 Deep Run (Alloway Creek), a tributary of Alloway Creek in Salem County
 Deep Run (Great Egg Harbor River),  a tributary of the Great Egg Harbor River in Atlantic County
 Deep Run (South River), a tributary of South River in Middlesex County
 Deep Run (Springers Brook), a tributary of Springers Brook in Burlington County

New York
 Deep Run (Canandaigua Lake), a tributary of Canandaigua Lake in Ontario County

North Carolina
 Deep Run, North Carolina, an unincorporated community in Lenoir County
 Deep Run (Broad Creek), a tributary of Broad Creek in Beaufort County
 Deep Run (Dawson Creek), a tributary of Dawson Creek in Pamlico County
 Deep Run (Upper Broad Creek), a tributary of Upper Broad Creek in Craven County

Pennsylvania
 Deep Run (Tohickon Creek), a tributary of Tohickon Creek in Bucks County

Virginia

 Deep Run Baptist Church, a historic church in Henrico County
 Deep Run Park, a public park in Henrico County